The Fair Grounds Oaks is a Grade II American Thoroughbred horse race for three-year-old fillies at a distance of one and one-sixteenth miles on the dirt run annually in March, usually on Louisiana Derby day at Fair Grounds Race Course in New Orleans, Louisiana.  The event currently offers a purse of $400,000.

History 
The race was inaugurated on 19 February 1966 as the eighth event on the card where the featured event was the A. B. Letellier Memorial Handicap. The event was held on a sloppy track with Oklahoma bred Help On Way, ridden by Larry Gilligan defeating Dutch Maid with Gee Ma in third. Help On Way next start was unsuccessfully run against colts and geldings in the Arkansas Derby.

The following year in 1967 winner Furl Sail continued to win the Acorn Stakes and Mother Goose Stakes and was fourth in the Coaching Club American Oaks.

	
In 1977 the Fair Grounds administration made a scheduling change and ran the event a second time in December over a distance of  miles.  In 1978 the event was run in December again with split divisions.  

The track administration then reverted to a March running with the shortened distance of  miles but did not hold the event in 1979.

The event was first upgraded in 1982 to a Grade III race.  The race was run as the Coca-Cola Fair Grounds Oaks in 1989 and 1990 with sponsorship from Coca-Cola.

In 2006 the race was cancelled due to massive damage inflicted upon Fair Grounds Race Course by Hurricane Katrina.

The race is considered a prep race to the Triple Tiara of Thoroughbred Racing, including the Kentucky Oaks, the Black-Eyed Susan Stakes and Mother Goose Stakes.

The race has produced numerous Kentucky Oaks winners, including Tiffany Lass, Blushing K. D., Silverbulletday, Ashado, Summerly, Proud Spell, Rachel Alexandra and  Believe You Can.

Records
Speed record: 
  miles – 1:42.20  Blushing K. D. (1997)

Margins:
 12 lengths – Truly Bound   (1981)

Most wins by a jockey:
 3 – Donnie Meche    (1997, 2000, 2003)
 3 – Florent Geroux    (2015, 2020, 2021)

Most wins by a trainer:
 4 – J. Larry Jones (2008, 2012, 2015, 2019)
 4 - Steve Asmussen (2003, 2005, 2014, 2022)

Most wins by an owner:
 2 - Albert M. Stall (1968, 1997)
 2 - Winchell Thoroughbreds (2005, 2014)

Winners

Notes:

§ Ran as an entry

† In the 1969 running of the event Around The Horn was first past the post but was disqualified and place second for interference in the straight and Royal Fillet was declared the winner.

See also
Road to the Kentucky Oaks
List of American and Canadian Graded races

References

Fair Grounds Race Course
Flat horse races for three-year-old fillies
Graded stakes races in the United States
Horse races in New Orleans
Horse racing
Recurring sporting events established in 1966
1966 establishments in Louisiana
Grade 2 stakes races in the United States